Lyria planicostata is a species of sea snail, a marine gastropod mollusk in the family Volutidae, the volutes.

Subspecies
 Lyria planicostata fijiensis Bail & Poppe, 2004 (length: 51.5 mm; occurs off the Fiji Islands)
 Lyria planicostata grohi Bail & Poppe, 2004 (occurs off Tonga)

Description
Adult shells attain a size of 75-80 mm.

Distribution
Philippines area.

References

 Kosuge S. (1980) Studies on the collection of Mr. Victor Dan (3) Note on the local variations of Lyria taiwanica Lan, 1975 (Gastropoda Volutacea). Bulletin of the Institute of Malacology, Tokyo 1(4): 65-66, pl. 17.
 Bail, P. & Poppe, G., 2004 The Tribe Lyriini. A revision of the Recent species of the genera Lyria, Callipara, Harpulina, Enaeta, and Leptoscapha, p. 93 pp, 68 pls

Volutidae
Gastropods described in 1903